The Rust Craft Greeting Card Company was an American greeting card, printing company and owner of television stations.

The company
The company was founded in a bookstore in Kansas City, Missouri, in 1906 by its owner, Fred Winslow Rust. The company's first Christmas card was printed on heavy tan paper and included a brief message in two colors. The success of the Christmas card grew into a business letters, postcards, and greeting cards with envelopes. Rust revolutionized the use of the "French Fold," which turned a single piece of paper into a card by folding it into quarters. They were the first company to sell greeting cards with a fitted envelope.

Rust was soon joined by his brother Donald.  Fred then began to focus more on the creative and sales aspects of the company while Donald managed the manufacturing and finances.  In time, the offerings grew to include cards for holidays including Valentine's Day, Easter, St. Patrick's Day, and Thanksgiving. In addition, cards were produced with bon voyage and travel messages, and even cards with messages in Braille.

The brothers eventually retired from the book store and moved to Massachusetts to focus on the greeting cards.  At first the company was located at 1000 Washington Street in Boston's South End neighborhood.  Needing more space, the company built a new facility on Rustcraft Road in nearby Dedham, Massachusetts in 1954. was at the time the largest greeting card factory in the world on what is today Rustcraft Road.

The company was known officially as United Printers and Publishers until 1962, when with its purchase and founding of television stations and some radio station purchases beginning several years before, began to trade off the good will of its product trademarks, rebranding the card line to Rust Craft Greeting Card Company, with the television division known as Rust Craft Broadcasting.

The company remained there until 1980 when it was purchased by Ziff Davis the year before for $89 million, who also owned Norcross Greeting Card Company. The printing assets were secondary to Ziff Davis, which mainly wanted Rust Craft for its six small-market television stations. Rust Craft's manufacturing was moved to West Chester, Pennsylvania where Norcross already have a facility. Windsor Communications soon purchased Rust Craft and Norcross when Ziff Davis spun them off, while retaining Rust Craft Broadcasting. Windsor spent $10 million in 1981 to close the Dedham plant, incentivize employees to stay on, and to move operations.

They struggled with heavy competition, and with only 6–7% of market share, eventually went bankrupt. American Greetings Corporation purchased what was left of the two companies.  At the time it went out of business, it had a Canadian affiliate, Rust Craft Ltd.

A collection of archived Rust Craft and Norcross cards, along with other archival materials dating back to pre-Declaration times in the mid-18th century, was donated to the Smithsonian Institution after the company went out of business.

Rust Craft Broadcasting television stations

† - Station founded and launched by Rust Craft

Rust family
The Rust brothers were born in Belfast, Maine, but moved to Kansas City as boys.  Fred wrote and published three volumes of poetry.  He lived in Newton, Massachusetts with his wife and son and had a summer house in Cohasset, Massachusetts.  He died in 1949 at the age of 73.  Donald had two sons with his wife, and later had four grandchildren.  He died in 1961 at 84, having spent his final years in Cohasset.

References

Works cited

1906 establishments in Missouri
Companies based in Dedham, Massachusetts
Greeting cards